The third round of the 1995 Australian Touring Car Championship was held on the weekend of 10 to 12 March at Mount Panorama, Bathurst, New South Wales. It consisted of two 15 lap races and the "Dash for Cash", a 3 lap sprint for the fastest 10 qualifiers, starting positions for the "dash" were drawn at random.  
Pole and the overall round was won by John Bowe.

Race results

Qualifying

Dash for Cash

Race 1

Race 2

Championship standings after the event
 After Round 3 of 10. Only the top five positions are included.
Drivers' Championship standings

References

External links 

1995 in Australian motorsport
Bathurst
Motorsport in Bathurst, New South Wales